Dennis Freeman may refer to:

Dennis L. Freeman (1939–2020), American politician
Denny Freeman (1944–2021), American musician